Calcutta News is a 2008 Indian Malayalam-language romantic thriller film written and directed by Blessy. The film stars Dileep, Meera Jasmine, Indrajith and Vimala Raman. The music is by Debojyoti Mishra. The film deals with the issue of trafficking in women and how an Orphan girl from Kerala gets caught in it. It showcased Blessy's yet another different genre film and successfully provided Dileep a different character unlike his usual comic characters.

Plot
Ajith Thomas (Dileep) is an acclaimed investigative television anchor and producer with a leading channel 'Calcutta News', and is the son of a former footballer who grew up in Kolkata. His team at the channel includes news assistant Smita (Vimala Raman), and anchors Aruna (Manasa) and Sheela (Brinda). Ajith is a lovable guy who lives in a flat with his mom and two sisters and is an active member of the Malayalee Samajam led by a comical president (Innocent) and his wife (Bindu Panicker) One day Ajith bumps into a newly married Malayalee couple while on work in a tram, but the guy is hostile when he tries to introduce himself as a Malayalee. However, while editing the news, he is shocked to find that an unidentified body found near Kalighat resembles the rude guy he met in the tram.

Ajit's investigative nature comes into the fore as he goes about finding the mystery behind the brutal murder of the guy. The guy was Hari (Indrajith), who had married an orphan Krishnapriya (Meera Jasmine) from Pattambi and brought her to Kolkata, before his brutal murder. Krishnapriya is unaware of her husband's job or what he does for a living and is shattered to know about his death. However, just before Hari is killed, Krishnapriya had come to known that Hari had only married her with the intention of delivering her, a young virgin, to his boss.

Krishnapriya is both relieved that she is safe from sex racket she almost fell into, as well as desperate and sad because Hari had been the only person she knew or could go to. She couldn't return home and had nowhere to go. She attempts suicide but fails. Hope floats into her life after Ajith sort of becomes her protector and also gets attracted to her for her innocence and their mutual love for music.

Krishnapriya moves in with Aruna and Sheela but cannot forget her past. When she comes across a psychic at Ajith's office she decides to approach him to know the exact cause of Hari's death. The psychic communicates with Hari's spirit and Krishnapriya come to know of who killed Hari. Ajith becomes concerned about Krishnapriya's obsession with the details of Hari's murder and the strange behaviour she exhibits sometimes. He takes the help of a psychologist to help her forget the painful memories, and she begins to live a normal life teaching music to children. The henchmen of the racket are meanwhile on the hunt for her, as they had already paid Hari for a new girl. The one-armed bearded guy (Kathal Krishnamoorthy) who operates from Sonagachi, the largest red-light area in eastern India, looking for Krishnapriya also wants to settle a score with her, because it was in the fight with Hari to get her that Hari had cut off his arm. On a tip off they trace her to the music school and kidnap her. Ajith tries to get the help of the police but they refuse to register a complaint without any proof. He is forced to go after his love all alone. When he enters the red-light area Ajith is shocked at the abuse and neglect the women are facing. He begins to record what he sees on his cell phone. The goons there find him inside and beat him up severely. He is now trapped deep in the red light area with goons out to kill him. In the mele, his cell phone falls out of his hand and is found by a little girl. The child is fascinated by the video recording going on and follows Ajith everywhere recording whatever happens to him. Eventually when she returns the phone to Ajith, the entire fight has been recorded on it. Ajith transmits it to the studio which airs it live along with his plea to rescue the women and himself. Police battalions arrive and free everyone including Ajith and Krishnapriya.

Cast 
 Dileep as Ajith Thomas
 Meera Jasmine as Krishna Priya
 Indrajith as Hari
 Vimala Raman as Smitha 
 Manasa as Aruna
 Binda as Sheela
 Innocent as Samajam President
 Bindu Panicker as Leela
 Chitra Shenoy as Ajith's mother
 Suja Menon as Ajith's sister
 Unni Maya as Ajith's sister

Reception
The film is considered as one of the action films by Blessy. The film gained positive reviews from the viewers and the critics praising the performances, the plot and the narration and also the serious subject they have discussed in the film which is currently ongoing in the country. Although the film was a commercial failure at the box office.

Soundtrack
The soundtrack features 6 songs composed by Debojyoti Mishra with lyrics penned by Vayalar Sarathchandra Varma and Kamalesh Mukherjee. 

"Kannadi Koottile" (Chithra, Vinitha and Vijaya)
"Arikiloru Chilla Mele" (Chithra, Asmitha Sengupta)
"Paangmula" (Bengali) (Sreekanth Acharya)
"Engu Ninnu" (Chithra, Madhu Balakrishnan)
"Kani Kanduvo" (Chithra)
"Nanmayaakunna" (Chithra)

References

External links 
 
 Calcutta News at Oneindia
 Calcutta News Review at Indiaglitz

Films set in Kolkata
2000s Malayalam-language films
Films about prostitution in India
Films shot in Kolkata
Films scored by Debojyoti Mishra
Films directed by Blessy